Stillwater Reservoir is a man-made lake located by Beaver River, New York within the Western Adirondacks. The lake has a large amount of recreational uses including camping, canoeing, boating, fishing, hunting, snowmobiling, and cross-country skiing. The lake has undeveloped edges with remote camping on both the islands and the shoreline. Camping permits and lake information may be obtained from the hamlet of Stillwater at the Forest Ranger Headquarters. Fish species present in the reservoir are smallmouth bass, splake, rock bass, yellow perch, sunfish and brown trout. There is a state owned hard surface ramp on Stillwater Road, 28 miles east of Lowville, New York. the record low temperature for the state of New York of  took place at Stillwater Reservoir, and was later tied by Old Forge on February 17, 1979.

Islands and locations 

Big Burnt Lake – A lake connected to Stillwater Reservoir located northwest of the hamlet of Beaver River.
Georges Island – Located off the Tower Trail campsite point.
Rock Island – Located by the inlet of Twitchell Creek.
Island #2 – Located by the inlet of Twitchell Creek. Has two primitive campsites on the island. 
Melody Island – Located near Devil's Hole. Has a primitive campsite on the island.
Round Island – Located off Little Burnt Point.
Nest Island – Located by Round Island.
Long Island – Has two primitive campsites on each end of the island.
Gun Harbor– A bay located north-northeast of the hamlet of Beaver River.
Island #16 – Located by Little Burnt Point, and has a primitive campsite on the island. 
Twin Pine Island – Located off The Notch Point. Has a primitive campsite on the island.
Spruce Island – Located off Hat Point. Has a primitive campsite on the island.
Island #26 – Has a primitive campsite on the island. 
Picnic Point West Island – East of picnic island. Has a primitive campsite on the island.
Picnic Island – Located off Picnic Point. Has two primitive campsites on the island.
Bay Island – Located off Bay Island Point. 
Sand Island – Located off Dead Man's Curve.
Trout Pond – A bay located north of Big Burnt Lake bay. It is where the outlet of Salmon Lake enters the reservoir.
Island #33 – Located in the Big Burnt Lake section of the reservoir. Has a primitive campsite on the island.
Needle Island – Located in the Big Burnt Lake section of the reservoir
Loon Island – Located in the Loon Lake section of the reservoir. Has a primitive campsite on the island.
Fox Island – Located near the outlet of Halfway Brook. Has a primitive campsite on the island.
Grassy Island – Located by Grassy Point.
Big Island – Located by Grassy Point.
Fly Island – Located by Gun Harbor.
North Island – Located by Gun Harbor.
State Island
South Island – Located south of the Wild Forest. 
Van Sickle Island – Located by the outlet of the reservoir. 
Chicken Island
Rapshaw Island
Gull Rock 
Hotel Island
Gull Island
Canfield Island

References

External links
  Stillwater Reservoir Boaters' Map

Reservoirs in Herkimer County, New York